Sevastyany is a rural locality (a village) in Kultayevskoye Rural Settlement, Permsky District, Perm Krai, Russia. The population was 12 as of 2010. There are 2 streets.

Geography 
Sevastyany is located 22 km southwest of Perm (the district's administrative centre) by road. Shumki is the nearest rural locality.

References 

Rural localities in Permsky District